Nauvoo (also Navoo) is an unincorporated community in York County, Pennsylvania, United States.

Notes

Unincorporated communities in York County, Pennsylvania
Unincorporated communities in Pennsylvania